Jaylon Tate (born January 16, 1995) is an American professional basketball player for the London Lightning of the National Basketball League of Canada (NBLC). Tate played college basketball for the University of Illinois.

High school career
Tate attended De La Salle Institute for his first two years of high school and later transferred to Simeon Career Academy. Along with teammates Jabari Parker and Kendrick Nunn, Simeon won consecutive Illinois High School Association state championships in 2012 and 2013.

After his official visit to Illinois, Tate verbally committed to the program and former head coach John Groce in October 2012. Tate played on the AAU circuit with the Meanstreets, coached by Tai Streets.

College career
At Illinois, Tate led his team in assists his sophomore year and assist to turnover ratio his senior year. As a junior, Tate underwent surgery to repair a dislocated finger. Tate was named All-Academic Big Ten during his junior and senior seasons.

College statistics

|-
| style="text-align:left;"| 2013–14
| style="text-align:left;"| Illinois
| 33 || 0 || 12.2 || 26.3 || 4.3 || 65.5 || .9 || 1.9 || 0.4 || 0.1 || 1.8
|-
| style="text-align:left;"| 2014–15
| style="text-align:left;"| Illinois
| 32 || 13 || 20.4 || 36.8 || 8.3 || 84.3 || 1.2 || 2.9 || 0.8 || 0.1 || 3.6
|-
| style="text-align:left;"| 2015–16
| style="text-align:left;"| Illinois
| 30 || 15 || 17.5 || 36.7 || 18.2|| 63.0 || 1.3 || 2.5 || .4 || 0.1 || 1.8
|-
| style="text-align:left;"| 2016–17
| style="text-align:left;"| Illinois
| 26 || 7 || 15.7 || 38.3 || 18.2 || 68.6 || 1.3 || 2.8 || 0.5 || 0.1 || 2.3

Professional career
In October 2017, Tate signed with the Niagara River Lions of the National Basketball League of Canada (NBLC). Following the 2017–18 NBL Canada season, Tate was named Rookie of the Year, leading the league with 7.53 assists per game and also averaging 13.1 points per game. He was also named to the Third Team All-NBLC. In July 2018, Tate signed with Pyrintö of the Finnish Korisliiga for the 2018-19 season.

He spent part of the 2019–20 season with the London Lightning, playing 5 games with the team. In October 2021, Tate joined the Santa Cruz Warriors of the NBA G League after a successful tryout. However, he was waived on December 17. Three days later, he was claimed off waivers by the South Bay Lakers. On December 22, 2021, Tate was waived by the South Bay Lakers.

London Lightning (2022–present)
On January 3, 2022, Tate was acquired by the Memphis Hustle of the NBA G League. However, before joining Memphis, he returned to London Lightning.

References

External links

Real GM Profile
Proballers Profile
Illinois Fighting Illini Profile
College Career Statistics

1995 births
Living people
21st-century African-American sportspeople
African-American basketball players
American expatriate basketball people in Canada
American expatriate basketball people in Finland
American men's basketball players
Basketball players from Chicago
Guards (basketball)
Illinois Fighting Illini men's basketball players
London Lightning players
Niagara River Lions players
Santa Cruz Warriors players
South Bay Lakers players
Tampereen Pyrintö players